Flash burn is any burn injury caused by intense flashes of light, high voltage electric current, or strong thermal radiation. These may originate from, for example, a sufficiently large BLEVE, a thermobaric weapon explosion or a nuclear blast of sufficient magnitude. Damage to the eye(s) caused by ultraviolet rays is known as photokeratitis.

Additional images

References

External links 

Burns
Medical emergencies
Articles containing video clips